Corrado Govoni (Tàmara, Copparo, 29 October 1884 – Lido dei Pini, 20 October 1965). was an Italian poet. His work dealt with modern urban representations, the states of memory, nostalgia, and longing, using an expressive and evocative style of writing.

Biography
Corrado Govoni was an Italian poet whose work emphasized "the minutiae of daily life". Prolific author, he can be considered as a member of both: the crepuscolari, or "twilight poets," and of the futurist movement. In Florence, as a young man, Govoni met the poet Giovanni Papini, who helped him to publish his first book of poems, Le fiale, in 1903, a volume "full of exotic images, difficult and rare rhymes, and unusual lexicon interspersed with archaic vocabulary".
In 1944 he experienced the loss of his son, Aladino Govoni, killed by nazi-fascists.
In 1950 Govoni won the Viareggio Prize for poetry.

Selected works

Poetry

  Le fiale, Firenze, Lumachi, 1903
 Armonia in grigio et in silenzio, Firenze, Lumachi, 1903
 Fuochi d'artifizio, Palermo, Ganguzza-Lajosa, 1905
 Gli aborti, Ferrara, Taddei, 1907
 Poesie elettriche, Milano, Edizioni Futuriste di "Poesia", 1911
 Inaugurazione della primavera, Ferrara, Taddei, 1915
 Rarefazioni, Milano, Edizioni di "Poesia", 1915
 Poesie scelte, edited by A. Neppi, Ferrara, Taddei, 1918
Poesie elettriche, Ferrara, Taddei, 1920
 Tre grani da seminare, Milano, Palmer, 1920
 Il quaderno dei sogni e delle stelle, Milano, Mondadori, 1924
 La Trombettina, Milano, Mondadori, 1924
 Brindisi alla notte, Milano, Bottega di Poesia, 1924
 Il flauto magico, Roma, Al tempo della Fortuna, 1932
 Canzoni a bocca chiusa, Firenze, Vallecchi, 1938
 Pellegrino d'amore, Milano, Mondadori, 1941
 Govonigiotto, Milano, Steli, 1943
 Aladino. Lamento su mio figlio morto, Milano, Mondadori, 1946
 L'Italia odia i poeti, Roma, Pagine Nuove, 1950
 Patria d'alto volo, Siena, Maia, 1953
 Preghiera al trifoglio, Roma, Casini, 1953
 Antologia poetica, edited and prefaced by G. Spagnoletti, Firenze, Sansoni, 1953
 Manoscritto nella bottiglia, with an essay of Giuseppe Ravegnani, Milano, Mondadori, 1954
 Stradario della primavera e altre poesie, Venezia, Neri Pozza, 1958
 Poesie (1903-1959), edited by Giuseppe Ravegnani, Milano, Mondadori, 1961
 Il Vino degli anni  edited by Tommaso Lisi, Roma, L'officina Libri, 1979
 Armonia in grigio et in silenzio, Bari, Palomar, 1992
Poesie, 1903 - 1958, Mondadori, 2000
 Aladino, edited by Giuseppe Lasala, Bari, Palomar, 2006
 Poesie elettriche, edited by Giuseppe Lasala, Macerata, Quodlibet, 2008
Gli Aborti, edited by Francesco Targhetta, Genova, Edizioni San Marco dei Giustiniani, 2008
 Fuochi d'artifizio, edited by Francesco Targhetta, Macerata, Quodlibet, 2013

Prose 
 La neve, Firenze, "La Voce (magazine)", 1915
 La caccia all'usignolo, Milano, Istituto Editoriale Italiano, 1915
 La santa verde, Ferrara, Taddei, 1919
 Anche l'ombra è sole, Milano, Mondadori, 1920
 Piccolo veleno color di rosa, Firenze, Bemporad, 1921
 La Terra contro il cielo, Milano, Mondadori, 1921
 La strada sull'acqua, Milano, Treves, 1923
 La cicala e la formica, Milano, Bottega di poesia, 1925
 Il volo d'amore, Milano, Mondadori, 1926
 Bomboniera, Roma, Sapientia, 1929
 La maschera che piange, L'Aquila, Vecchioni, 1930
 Misirizzi, Firenze, Vallecchi, 1930
 I racconti della ghiandaia, Lanciano, Carabba, 1932
 Arcobaleno, Lanciano, Carabba, 1932
 Il Temporale, Catanzaro, San Gennaro, 1934
 Splendore della poesia italiana, Milano, Hoepli, 1937, nuova ed. , Milano, Ceschina, 1958
 Le rovine del Paradiso, Firenze, Vallecchi, 1940
 Il pane degli angeli, Napoli, Clet, 1940
 Confessioni davanti allo specchio, Brescia, Morceliana, 1942

Bibliography 
Giovanni Papini; Pietro Pancrazi, Corrado Govoni, in Poeti d'oggi (1900-1920), Firenze, Vallecchi, 1920, pp. 160-170.
Fausto Curi, Corrado Govoni, Milano, Mursia 1981.
Giuseppe Iannaccone, Suppliche al Duce: documentazione inedita sui rapporti tra il poeta Corrado Govoni e Mussolini, Milano, Terziaria, 2002.
Riccardo D'Anna, Govoni, Corrado, in Dizionario biografico degli italiani, vol. 58, Roma, Istituto dell'Enciclopedia Italiana, 2002. URL consultato il 21 maggio 2015.
Matteo Bianchi (edited by), Corrado Govoni. Il poeta a cui non bastava la realtà, Ferrara, La Carmelina, 2016.
Paolo Maccari, The presence of a poet: Corrado Govoni in the 20th century anthologies and literary criticism.

References 

Italian male poets
Italian fascists
Italian anti-communists
Italian Futurism
1884 births
1965 deaths
Futurist writers
20th-century Italian poets
20th-century Italian male writers
People from the Province of Ferrara
Viareggio Prize winners